Clinton was the first steam ferry built in California and used on San Francisco Bay in 1853.

History
Clinton was built by Domingo Marcucci in early 1853, for Charles Minturn of the Conta Costa Steam Navigation Company. She was launched 60 days from the day her keel was laid.

She ran on the Creek Route between San Francisco and the eastern shore until 1865 when Minturn sold out his interest in the Creek Route to the railroad.  In 1866 he moved the remains of his fleet to operate between San Francisco and Marin and Sonoma Counties.

In 1874 Clinton was purchased by the San Rafael & San Quentin Railroad and put on the run to San Rafael. Clinton ended her career in 1877, sinking after a collision with another ship.

References

Ferries of California
Sidewheel steamboats of California
Transportation in the San Francisco Bay Area
History of the San Francisco Bay Area
Ships built in San Francisco
1853 ships